Tulumtaş is a village in the Kurtalan District of Siirt Province in Turkey. The village is populated by Kurds of the Erebiyan tribe and had a population of 867 in 2021.

The hamlets of Akbulut, Çukurlu and Evciler are attached to Tulumtaş.

References 

Kurdish settlements in Siirt Province
Villages in Kurtalan District